Ball of Fire (also known as The Professor and the Burlesque Queen) is a 1941 comedy film. '"Ball(s) of Fire" may also refer to:

Music
 "Ball of Fire" (song), by Tommy James and the Shondells
 Ball of Fire, a ska album by Jamaican ska-band Skatalites
 Balls of Fire, a 1976 album by Southern rock band Black Oak Arkansas

Other
 5th Indian Division in World War II, nicknamed Ball of Fire

See also
Great Balls of Fire (disambiguation)
Fireball (disambiguation)